"Over There" is a 1917 song written by George M. Cohan that was popular with the United States military and public during both world wars. It is a patriotic song designed to galvanize American young men to enlist and fight the "Hun". The song is best remembered for a line in its chorus: "The Yanks are coming."

History

It has been revived on various occasions during and after World War II. It was not heavily used during the Vietnam War, but has been used since the September 11 terrorist attacks.

Lyrics

As sung by early 20th-century recording artist Billy Murray:

See also 
 List of best-selling sheet music

Notes

References

External links

Nora Bayes recording July 13, 1917, via U.S. Library of Congress, National Jukebox
Vintage Audio: Over There
Rendition by Billy Murray and quartet
Library of Congress essay on recording on the National Recording Registry.
Sheet music for "Over There", Leo Feist, Inc., 1917.
Over There from Patriotic Melodies

1917 songs
American patriotic songs
Songs about the military
Songs of World War I
Billy Murray (singer) songs
Songs written by George M. Cohan
Nora Bayes songs
Grammy Hall of Fame Award recipients
Songs used as jingles
United States National Recording Registry recordings
American military marches